The Interstate Athletic Conference is an all-boys high school sports league made up of six private high schools in the Washington, D.C., area, competing in twelve varsity sports: baseball, basketball, cross country, football, golf, ice hockey, lacrosse, soccer, swimming and diving, tennis, track and field, and wrestling. The IAC is widely regarded as one of the most competitive and talent-deep lacrosse leagues in the nation. Some schools in the IAC are co-ed, so they do not have as many boys to participate in athletics as some schools in the MAC and WCAC. For example, Gonzaga College High School (WCAC), have over 900 boys enrolled at the school while Episcopal High School (IAC) only has 435 boys and girls combined. Although this is true, the IAC is seen as on par with or surpassing the WCAC and the MAC and more competitive than the PVAC, the other private high school sports conferences in the Washington, D.C. area. The IAC is also known for its academics as it boasts 3 of the most elite boarding schools in the country.

Members

Past members

History
 1970: Georgetown Prep's football team is banned from the league. This ban lasts 11 years.
 2004: League Headmasters meet and decide to remove Georgetown Prep's football team, citing the schools larger number of male students and higher football aspirations than the league's other schools.
2019: Saint Stephen’s and Saint Agnes wins state Championship in lacrosse

Notable athletes and coaches

Landon School
 Sam Anas, hockey
 Darion Atkins, basketball
 Ian Healy, lacrosse
 Fred Hetzel, basketball
 Maury Povich, basketball
 Danny Rubin, basketball
 Matt Ward, '02, lacrosse (winner of the Tewaaraton trophy)
 Rob Bordley, football, lacrosse, rugby and coach

Episcopal High School
 Danny Coale, '07, football
 Tim Hightower, '04, football
 John McCain, '54, wrestling
 Arinze Onuaku, '05, basketball

St. Albans School
 Red Auerbach, basketball coach
 Matt Bowman, baseball
 Olin Browne, golf
 Al Gore, Basketball, football
 Jesse Hubbard, '94, lacrosse
 Danny Hultzen, baseball
 Ray Brown (runner), track and field
 Brooks Johnson, athletic director/coach 
 Nick Lowery, football
 Lester Lyles, football, basketball
 Jonathan Ogden, '92, football
 Manny Quezada, basketball
 Luke Russert, golf

Bullis School
 William Nylander, hockey
 Dwayne Haskins, football
 Steve Armas, soccer
 Moise Fokou, football
 Dan Goldie, tennis
 Tanard Jackson, '03, football coach
 Doug Moe, basketball
 Rodney Wallace, soccer

Georgetown Preparatory School
 Roy Hibbert, '04, basketball
 Marcus Mason, '03, football
 John Ricca, football
 Arthur Smith (American football, born 1982), football

St. Stephens and St. Agnes School
 Michael Schwimer, baseball
Colin Cross,Football, Hockey,Academic excellence
 Loui Goin, 1x Dean List Selection, All Time Freshman Passing Yards Record, All Time Freshman Passing Touchdowns Record, All Time Freshman Rushing Touchdowns Record

Sidwell Friends School (1999 and earlier)
 Paul Goldstein, '94, tennis

References

High school sports conferences and leagues in Washington, D.C.